Xeromphalina junipericola is a species of agaric fungus in the family Mycenaceae. Found in Juniperus thurifera forests of Spain, it was described as new to science in 1996. The fruit bodies have purplish to violaceous tinged caps measuring 0.2–0.6 cm in diameter. It has smooth, amyloid, and hyaline (translucent) spores measuring 3–4 by 2–2.5 μm.

References

External links

Fungi described in 1996
Fungi of Europe
Mycenaceae